KJIW-FM (94.5 FM) is a radio station licensed to Helena, Arkansas, United States.  The station airs a Gospel music format and is owned by Elijah Mondy, Jr.

References

External links
KJIW's official website
 

Gospel radio stations in the United States
JIW-FM